Maria Baptist (born 30 August 1971) is a German musician (pianist, composer) and professor.

Career
Maria Baptist was born in 1971 in East Berlin in a very musical family. Her grandfather was an orchestra musician and composer, her father himself is a pianist. Maria discovered very early her fascination for music and at the age of six she began playing the piano. At the age of eleven she composed her first pieces. Maria developed her desire to become a classical concert pianist. At the age of fifteen Maria listened to recordings of Dave Brubeck and Keith Jarrett and discovered for the first time the world of jazz and improvisation. Impressed by the musical expression, Maria felt that she had to continue on this path. She began studying piano at the music university in Berlin and won her first international piano competitions on improvisation.
During this period, the Berlin Wall fell, which meant a great personal change in Maria's life. She took the opportunity to move to New York. Here Maria experienced the freedom, space and magic, which opened up whole new musical worlds to her. Maria's artistic work was significantly influenced and inspired by the tremendous creativity, energy, living will, the strength and melancholy of the metropolis.

What remains until today is Maria's musical curiosity: Her music is characterised by absolute openness, she breaks up genre boundaries and without effort there comes energy that builds up to fascinating ranges of sounds. During her composition studies in New York with Maria Schneider, Maria Baptist came into contact with the orchestral music. "Her music is a gift, infused with all the creativity, power, emotion, generosity and warmth that she exudes in life.“ commends the famous American big band composer the work of her Berlin colleague Maria Baptist.

With twenty-five Maria returns to Berlin and is celebrated as the great young talent by the press and her audience. During this time she won a series of internationally renowned competitions including the Leipzig jazz price, the hr Big Band Composition Contest, the prize of the Thad Jones Competition for full orchestra with the Danish Radio Jazz Orchestra in Copenhagen and the NDR Composers Competition. Maria was invited to festivals and concerts throughout Europe. She thrilled her audience with her virtuoso ease, her passionate devotion and authenticity. Well-known soloists such as Ingrid Jensen, Rolf Kühn & Gitte Haenning and ensembles such as the Rias Big Band, the hr Big Band & Budapest Jazz Orchestra, were working together with Maria.
Parallel to all the concerts, Maria finished her studies. Her curiosity was unlimited: In Berlin at the age of twenty-four, she started studying classical composition. Her two studies laid the foundation for a further focus of Maria's career: the joy of teaching. At the age of twenty-six, when she was still a student, Maria was already jazz teacher at the University of Music in Berlin. Since the age of twenty-nine she has been a guest professor at the University of Music "Hanns Eisler", where she teaches composition, arranging, improvisation and jazz theory.

Throughout her career Maria published previously seven CDs (in a variety of instrumentations). She has no fear of contact with genre boundaries: as the first jazz pianist Maria played Arnold Schoenberg's Pierrot Lunaire with jazz improvisations.
Her latest Jazz Trio CD "Spring in Berlin“ offers an enormous variety of sounds: from chamber music influences, lyrical melodies to heavy grooving parts full of intensity and drive. Maria works with contrasts, subtile moments with emotional deepness and is able to connect classical influences with Jazz in a very natural and gentle way without effort.The album is highly acclaimed by the press: „cool groove & cultivated touch with a great effect“ (Piano News). „Spring in Berlin“ is full of sunlight“ (Jazzthetik), a listening pleasure (Jazzpodium). „Maria knows how to make a Trio burn“, says a famous German reviewer.

In the same way, Maria convinces her live audience: as a soloist, in the intimacy of the jazz trio or as an orchestra conductor. She offers fascinating sound structures and Maria‘s playing is always very intense and breathtaking virtuoso. She gave concerts e.g. in the United States, China, South Africa, Cuba, France, Iceland, Denmark, Greece, Sweden, Italy, Luxembourg, Hungary and Spain.

In 2010 she took part at the Reykjavik Jazz Festival, which is a new unique and inspiring place for live Jazz. As a special concert experience Maria conducted the Reykjavik Big Band. She composed an „Icelandic Suite“, which had the world premiere. In 2008 there has been already a collaboration with Baptist and the Reykjavik Big Band, which acclaimed highly reputation.
In 2011 Maria will combine her passion for conducting, composing and teaching. As a successor of Peter Herbolzheimer, she will lead the Federal Youth Orchestra of Germany. As a dedication to her fascination for big cities, the concert program "City Grooves" will be premiered.

Maria Schneider (composer, arranger New York) about Maria Baptist: "Her music is a gift, infused with all the creativity, power, emotion, generosity and warmth that she exudes in life."

Professorship
Apart from her engagements as a performer and composer, Maria has been a professor at the Hochschule für Musik "Hanns Eisler" Berlin since 2001. She teaches composition, arranging, improvisation and music theory.
In addition Maria is in great demand for teaching at international workshops. She is also a judge of different competitions and awards—as an example she was a jury member of the yearly jazz grant of the Berlin Senat in 2010.

Workshops
 Workshop at the Film & Television Academy | Potsdam | 2010
 Workshop with the Big Band at the Jazz Institut in Berlin |  2009
 Bigband concert at the Academy of Music & Theatre Munich |  2009
 Workshop during a festival in Patras in the context of:”European capital of culture“ | Greece | 2006
 Conducting the Youth Bigband Jena | 2005
 Workshop at the International Chamber Music Festival | Stellenbosch/South Africa | 2005
 Workshop in Frankfurt am Main | 2002, 2006
 Conducting the Bigband at the Academy of Music & Theatre Hamburg | 2002
 Workshop with the Bigband of the Academy of Music "Hanns Eisler" Berlin | 2000
 Workshop at the Franz-Liszt Music Academy | Budapest/Hungary | 1998
 Conducting the Youth Bigband of Brandenburg | 1998

Awards
 International Composers Competition of the Danish Radio Jazz Orchestra | Copenhagen | Thad Jones Composers Competition Award | 2000
 The German Radio Station Rundfunk Berlin-Brandenburg coproduces various CD Productions | 1999, 2003, 2005, 2009
 Conductors Competition of the German Radio Station Norddeutscher Rundfunk | Award | 1998
 Scholarship of the Berlin Senate | commission of a Bigband Suite | 1998
 Bigband Competition of the German Radio Station Hessischer Rundfunk | Composers Award | Frankfurt/Main | 1996
 Jazz Young Star Competition | Leipzig | Winner | 1996
 Commission of a Bigband piece of the Berlin Senate | 1996
 Bigband Competition of the German Radio Station Hessischer Rundfunk | Composers Award | Frankfurt/Main | 1995
 Artistic Grant of the Berlin Senate for studies in New York | 1995,1994
 International Piano Competition for Improvisation | Vilnius/Lithuania | Award | 1992

Discography
 Maria Baptist TRIO: Spring in Berlin (2010)
 Maria Baptist & Telmo Pires: Sinal (2009)
 Opus 21 – Arnold Schönberg: Pierrot lunaire plus Jazz Interludes by Maria Baptist (2007)
 Maria Baptist TRIO: Music for my Trio (2006)
 Maria Baptist: Sometimes Alone (2005)
 Maria Baptist TRIO: Crazy Dreams (2000)

Compositions
Orchestra:
 Night Scenes for Jazztrio and Orchestra in 4 movements | 2009
 Night Scenes for Orchestra and Bigband | 2005
 Trilogy of a Metamorphose for Jazztrio and Orchestra | 2003
 Impressions of a journey for solo piano and string orchestra | 2003

Chamber:
 9 Episodes for Piano and String Quartet | recorded in coproduction with rbb 2009, CD-Release 2011
 Short Trip in three movements for solo piano and chamber ensemble (11 Instruments) | 2007
 Impressions of a Journey in 3 Movements for Solo Piano + String Quartet | 2009
 Dezemberfarben for Brass ensemble | 2006
 Melody for You für Flöte und Kontrabass | 2005
 String quartet Nr. 1 in three movements | 2002
 Compositions for 3 voices, flute, clarinet, piano, percussion, violin, violoncello | 2002
 String quartet Klangdenkmal for the victims of the Holocaust | 2001
 String quartet Back and Forth | 1994

References

External links
Official website
Official Myspace

1971 births
German women composers
German composers
German classical pianists
German women pianists
Academic staff of the Hochschule für Musik Hanns Eisler Berlin
Living people
Musicians from Berlin
21st-century classical pianists
Women classical pianists
21st-century women pianists